Madeleine Murphy (born 30 July 1997) is an indoor and field hockey player from Australia.

Personal life
Madeleine Murphy was born and raised in Riana, Tasmania.

Career

Indoor hockey
Murphy has represented the Australian indoor team on numerous occasions. She made her debut in 2015 during an invitational tournament in Durban. She also appeared at the FIH Indoor World Cup in Berlin.

In 2023 she was named in the Australian squad for her second FIH Indoor World Cup in Pretoria.

Field hockey

Domestic league
In Hockey Australia's domestic league, the Sultana Bran Hockey One, Murphy captains the Tassie Tigers.

Jillaroos
Murphy was a member of the Jillaroos squad that won gold at the 2016 Junior Oceania Cup on the Gold Coast.

References

External links

1997 births
Living people
Australian female field hockey players
Female field hockey midfielders
People from Tasmania

2018 FIH Indoor Hockey World Cup players
2023 FIH Indoor Hockey World Cup players